Frank Newton (2 January 1909 – 17 September 1973) was a New Zealand cricketer. He played in one first-class match for Canterbury in 1938/39.

See also
 List of Canterbury representative cricketers

References

External links
 

1909 births
1973 deaths
New Zealand cricketers
Canterbury cricketers
Place of birth missing